Nathaniel Augustin Cruz (born February 22, 1960), more popularly known as Mang Tani, is a Filipino meteorologist who formerly served as a meteorologist for PAGASA from 1982 to 2010 and has been serving as a radio and television weather presenter for GMA News from 2012 to 2022.

Early life and education
Nathaniel Agustin Cruz was born in Manila on February 22, 1960, to Ernesto de la Merced Cruz and Cecilia Sanchez Agustin.

He studied agricultural engineering at the Gregorio Araneta University and later graduated in 1981.

After his graduation from the Gregorio Araneta University in 1981, Cruz earned a Master of Science degree in meteorology at the University of the Philippines Diliman in 1999.

Career
After his graduation from the University of the Philippines  Diliman in 1982, Cruz joined the Philippine Atmospheric, Geophysical and Astronomical Services Administration (PAGASA) as meteorologist and spokesperson and also worked for the agency's hydrology division and he later promoted in 2004 as officer-in-charge of the Office of the Deputy Administratator until his retirement in July 2010.

In 1989, Cruz went on a temporary leave from PAGASA for the first time and worked for Arab-American Oil Company in Saudi Arabia.

In 2008, Cruz was temporarily worked for the Asian Disaster Preparedness Center (ADPC) in Bangkok, Thailand as a climatologist.

In July 2010, Cruz went to Darwin, Northern Territory in Australia to join the Bureau of Meteorology (BOM) as meteorologist, but he left the country in 2012 after the illness of his wife Gloria Cruz.

On June 4, 2012, Cruz returned to the Philippines and joined GMA Network's news department as the weather presenter on the network's news television programs Unang Hirit and 24 Oras, while he occasionally appeared on other GMA News programs when typhoons within the Philippine Area of Responsibility (PAR) is expected to make landfall and he presented the science magazine program Hamon ng Kalikasan on GMA News TV from September until December 2012 and radio program I.M. Ready sa Dobol B on DZBB since 2017.

On July 21, 2018, during a weather segment in Balitanghali on GMA News TV, when he asked GMA News anchor Jun Veneracion about the updates of Tropical Depression Josie, he mistakenly calling Veneracion as "Josie", named after  the tropical depression that hit the country.

In 2021, Cruz went on a temporary leave from both 24 Oras and Unang Hirit, as he went on vacation in Melbourne, Australia, but he still does the remote work as the weather forecaster of GMA News.

In 2022, Cruz went again on a temporary leave.

Personal life
He married Gloria Cruz. As of 2021, Cruz and his family resides in Melbourne, Australia.

Filmography

Television

See also
 Amado Pineda - GMA Network's first weather presenter from 1976 until 1996.
 PAGASA
 Prisco Nilo - Another PAGASA meteorologist retired in 2010.

References

External links
 
 
 

Living people
1960 births
Filipino meteorologists
Filipino television meteorologists
GMA Network personalities
GMA Integrated News and Public Affairs people
People from Metro Manila
University of the Philippines Diliman alumni
PAGASA people
Weather presenters